Medly Pharmacy was a digital pharmacy retail company founded in 2017 by Marg Patel.

History
Medly Pharmacy was firstly founded by Marg Patel when his life experiences taught him about the problems and inefficiencies about health and medical care. Due to this, he founded the company to leverage innovative technology to modernize pharmacy of the future.

On December 16, 2020, Medly opened their three-story headquarters in Bushwick, Brooklyn, New York.

Throughout most of 2022, Medly started to struggle a lot, by losing a lot of money, laying off more than half of its staff members, and closing most of its retail stores. Former employees stated that Medly's decline and collapse was because the company grew too quickly.

On December 9, 2022, Medly filed for Chapter 11 bankruptcy protection.

On February 9, 2023, Medly announced it would sell all remaining assets to Walgreens, and would shut down all remaining stores and operations after 6 years.

References

External links

2017 establishments in New York (state)
American companies established in 2017
Pharmacies of the United States
Retail companies established in 2017
Bushwick, Brooklyn
Companies based in Brooklyn
Companies that filed for Chapter 11 bankruptcy in 2022
Retail companies disestablished in 2023
2023 disestablishments in New York (state)